The 2004–05 season was the 102nd competitive season in Belgian football.

Overview
The Brussels derby is played once again since FC Brussels promoted.

National team
Belgium began their qualifying campaign for the Football World Cup 2006.

Key
 H = Home match
 A = Away match
 F = Friendly
 WCQ = FIFA World Cup 2006 Qualifying, European Zone Group 7

Honours

Final tables

Belgian First Division

Second division

Third division

Third division A
For their second season since the renewal of the club, Y.R. K.V. Mechelen gained the title this time in extremis before R. Cappellen F.C., who reaches the third division playoffs along with Torhout 1992 K.M. and F.C. Denderleeuw respectively winners of the first and second slices.  The third slice went to Mechelen so it is Cappellen that replaces them in the playoffs.  K.F.C. Evergem-Center and K. Lyra T.S.V. are relegated to promotion while K.S.K. Wevelgem City will fight in the Promotion playoffs.

Third division B
United Overpelt-Lommel won this year's edition with a comfortable advance and also won the last two slices.  Oud-Heverlee Leuven has won the first slice so the 3rd and 4th placed teams (respectively K.S.K. Tongeren and R. Sprimont Comblain Sport) enter the playoffs.  At the bottom of the table, Seraing R.U.L. and Veldwezelt will play Promotion next season while U.R. Namur will have to undergo the playoffs.

See also
 Belgian First Division 2004-05
 2004 Belgian Super Cup
 Belgian Second Division
 Belgian Third Division: divisions A and B
 Belgian Promotion: divisions A, B, C and D

References